The  Mural Paintings from the Herrera Chapel  is group of mural painting by Annibale Carracci and collaborators, conserved between the National Art Museum of Catalonia and de Museo del Prado.

History 
In 1602, the Spanish nobleman Juan Enriquez de Herrera dedicated a chapel in the church of Santiago, the Spanish Franciscan of Rome to Diego de Alcala, commissioning Saint Didacus of Alcalá Presenting Juan de Herrera's Son to Christ and frescoes from Carracci. The mural decoration, with scenes from the saint's life, was done by the Bolognese painter Annibale Carracci. In 1604 began designing the master of all the preparatory cartoons, but he came ill while personally directing the work 'in situ'. So, the work was finished by his collaborators, who included Giovanni Lanfranco, Sisto Badalocchio and Francesco Albani. The frescoes in the Herrera chapel were transferred to canvas at the request of the sculptor Antonio Solá, at the expense of Ferdinand VII, and arrived in Spain in 1851. They are now distributed between MNAC and Museo del Prado.

Description 
The group consists of 16 items, 9 of which are kept at the MNAC and the other 7 at the Museo del Prado in Madrid. From the former church of San Giacomo degli Spagnuoli in Rome.

References

External links 

  The artwork at Museum's website

Paintings in the collection of the Museu Nacional d'Art de Catalunya
1600 paintings
Paintings of the Virgin Mary
Paintings depicting Paul the Apostle
Paintings of gods
Paintings depicting Saint Peter
Paintings of Francis of Assisi
Paintings by Annibale Carracci